The Great Egg Race was a BBC television series, that ran from 1979 to 1986 broadcast on BBC 2. Twenty-two episodes were produced and presented by six presenters over the life of the show.

Programme
The Great Egg Race was a BBC television series, that ran from 1979 to 1986 broadcast on BBC 2.

Presented by Brian Cant (1979), Johnny Ball (1980), Hilary Henson (1980–81), Charlotte Allen (1982), Professor Heinz Wolff (originally head judge, head presenter from 1983), and Lesley Judd, who joined the series in 1984.

Re-edited 15-minute episodes of the original show were later made for BBC Choice in 2000, under the title The Great Egg Race Rides Again.

The show featured teams creating Heath Robinson-esque mechanical creations in an attempt to solve a problem set at the start of the show.  The series obtained its name from the initial challenge of making a device capable of transporting an egg in a rubber-band-powered vehicle the furthest possible distance without breaking it. After the initial egg-related challenges, other non-egg events were introduced.

In the first episode, as well as the egg-carrying challenge between several devices, three teams had to precision weigh three items – a feather, an egg and a household brick (a weight range 10,000:1) – using a 50g weight and ordinary domestic items. In the last episode the two teams' sole challenge was to take an aerial photograph of an offshore oil rig.

Scoring was given for "design", "courage" and "entertainment".

The producers were Peter Bruce (12 episodes, 1979–80) and Charles Huff (10 episodes, 1983–86).
Specialist judges included Professor Michael French and Fred Dibnah.

The theme music was by Richard Denton and Martin Cook and is featured on the BBC Records LP Top BBC-TV Themes - Vol 2 (1979).

See also
Scrapheap Challenge

References

External links
Selected shows from the series (BBC archive)

1979 establishments in the United Kingdom
1986 disestablishments in the United Kingdom
1979 British television series debuts
1986 British television series endings
BBC science
BBC Television shows
Engineering competitions
Innovation in the United Kingdom
Television series by Aardman Animations